Jircan or Hirkan (Quechua) is one of eleven districts of the province Huamalíes in Peru.

See also 
 Awqa Punta
 Miyu Pampa
 Urpish

References